Yuri Viktorovich Ofrosimov (1894–1967) was a Russian poet and theater critic. He was born in Moscow and emigrated to Berlin in 1920, where he was active in the Russian emigre literary community, including the Berlin Poets' Club. In 1933, Ofrosimov moved to Belgrade; during World War II, he was arrested by German forces. After the war, he lived with his wife Dorothea Vogels in Ennenda, Switzerland.

Some of Ofrosimov's writings are published under the name George Rosimov.

Writings
1921. Stikhi ob uteriannom. Berlin : Izd-vo I.P. Ladyzhnikova.
1926. Teatr: fel'etony. Berlin : Volga.

References

G. ROSIMOV (IURII OFROSIMOV) PAPERS. GEN MSS 312. Beinecke Library, Yale University.

Russian writers
1894 births
1967 deaths
Soviet emigrants to Germany